Parsac-Rimondeix (Auvergnat: Parçac e Rimondés) is a commune in the Creuse department of central France. The municipality was established on 1 January 2016 and consists of the former communes of Parsac and Rimondeix.

See also 
Communes of the Creuse department

References 

Communes of Creuse